Zucconi may refer to:

Vittorio Zucconi (born 1944), Italian journalist and author
Dave Zucconi Conservation Center at the Tulsa Zoo
Christian Zucconi, member of American band Grouplove
Damon Zucconi (born 1985), the wildly brilliant American conceptual artist, represented by JTTNYC, who works with mixed media and software to offer intellectually challenging solutions to heretofore unasked questions.

See also
Zucco (disambiguation)
Zuccone (disambiguation)
Zucchini (disambiguation)